The Church of St Cadoc, Penrhos, Monmouthshire is a parish church with its origins in the 15th century. Restored in the 19th century, it remains an active parish church, and has recently undergone major renovation. The church is a Grade II* listed building.

History
The church is 15th century in origin, in a Perpendicular style. The church was restored in 1848 and again, under the direction of the architect John Prichard, in 1878. The tower was restored in 1905. By 2016 the church was in a poor state of repair and the nave was inaccessible, due to safety concerns. Restoration works have now been completed, supported by a grant of £121,00 from the Heritage Lottery Fund.

Architecture and description
The church is built of Old Red Sandstone. The style is Perpendicular.

Notes

References
 

Grade II* listed churches in Monmouthshire
History of Monmouthshire
Church in Wales church buildings
15th-century church buildings in Wales